Gouvieux is a commune in the Oise department in northern France.

Geography
The commune is served by the Chantilly-Gouvieux station on the RER D line or the TER trains from the Parisian Gare du Nord station. The town is located in the Chantilly urban area.

Population

Notable people
Aga Khan IV lives in Aiglemont estate in Gouvieux.

International relations
Gouvieux is twinned with:
  Nümbrecht, Germany
  Dorking, UK

See also
 Communes of the Oise department

References

Communes of Oise